Alejandro Treviño Castro (born August 26, 1957) is a Mexican former professional baseball catcher. He played in Major League Baseball (MLB) for the New York Mets, Cincinnati Reds, Atlanta Braves, San Francisco Giants, Los Angeles Dodgers, and Houston Astros from 1978 to 1990. Since 1996, Treviño has been a broadcaster for Astros games. He is the younger brother of MLB outfielder Bobby Treviño.

Early years
Treviño was born in Monterrey, Nuevo León, Mexico. He was sixteen years old when the New York Mets purchased his contract from Ciudad Victoria. Originally an infielder in Mexico, he was moved behind the plate his first season with the Appalachian League Marion Mets.

New York Mets
He made his major league debut on September 11, catching Mardie Cornejo in the ninth. His first at bat came pinch hitting against the Philadelphia Phillies on September 23. He made his first start against the Chicago Cubs at Wrigley Field on September 29, and collected his first major league hit against Mike Krukow in the sixth. On October 1, the last day of the season, Treviño started the game behind the plate, but moved to third base in the third inning.

Though Treviño was primarily a catcher by this point in his career, the Mets would make regular use of his ability to play the infield. In , he would make 27 appearances at third base & eight at second. They were following a similar script in  until injuries to John Stearns & Ron Hodges made Treviño the primary catcher. He responded by setting a career high in RBIs (37), and throwing out a league leading 44% of potential base stealers (47 of 106). In a more limited role, he threw out 48% in 1979. While his production dropped in the second half (.222 avg., 2 RBIs), he returned to regular use on the infield, and also made his outfield debut.

Following the season, he and pitchers Greg A. Harris and Jim Kern were dealt to the Cincinnati Reds for former National League MVP George Foster.

Cincinnati Reds
As Johnny Bench was 34 years old to start the  season, his days behind the plate were officially over. Joe Nolan, who had done the bulk of the catching for the Reds in 1981, was dealt to the Baltimore Orioles during Spring training, opening the door for Treviño to be Bench's heir. On September 14, in his 1,056th career at bat, Treviño hit his first career home run off the San Francisco Giants' Atlee Hammaker. For the season, Treviño batted .251 with 33 RBIs & just the one home run in a career high 401 plate appearances. While Treviño's numbers were not surprising (he batted .261 in his Mets career), Treviño seemed to fall off defensively. Whereas he'd caught 45% of base stealers as a Met, in his first season as a Red, it dipped to 29% (league average: 32%).

1982 was the first time in Cincinnati Reds franchise history that they lost over a hundred games, and the "Big Red Machine" was used to more production from the catcher position. As his back up, Treviño batted .216 with one home run & thirteen RBIs. Sixteen games into the  season, Treviño was dealt to the Atlanta Braves for a player to be named later.

Atlanta Braves
The Braves finished the 1983 season in second place in the National League West, three games back of the Los Angeles Dodgers. Treviño was excited to join a winning franchise for the first time in his career. In his first game as a Brave, Treviño caught former Mets teammate Pete Falcone. Pitching to his former battery-mate, Falcone held the Houston Astros to three hits in pitching his first shutout since 1981. It was the first of eight consecutive wins with Treviño behind the plate the Braves strung together upon his arrival. During this stretch, Treviño batted .400 (12 for 30) with five RBIs & six runs scored. Facing the Montreal Expos on May 6, Treviño hit an eighth inning one out double, and came around to score the go ahead run on Mike Jorgensen's single to give the Braves the lead. Tim Wallach led the bottom of the ninth off with a home run for Montreal. The Expos then put the tying & winning runs on base with no outs. Treviño picked the lead runner off second to ease the threat. His only season in Atlanta, Treviño batted .244 with three home runs & 28 RBIs splitting catching duties pretty evenly with Bruce Benedict.

San Francisco Giants
Seven games into the  season, the Braves & San Francisco Giants swapped catchers; Treviño for John Rabb, even up. Treviño spent just the one season in San Francisco. Whereas he only received 157 at bats as Bob Brenly's back up, he hit a career high six home runs. After the season, he was dealt to the Los Angeles Dodgers for outfielder Candy Maldonado.

Los Angeles Dodgers
With Mike Scoscia firmly locking down the catching job in LA, Treviño didn't see much playing time there, either. He made history on June 13,  against the San Diego Padres at Jack Murphy Stadium. With Fernando Valenzuela on the mound, they formed the first Mexican-born battery in major league history. For the season, he batted .262 with four home runs & 26 RBIs, and threw out 44% of base stealers (31 of 70). He also made his debut at first base. In , he batted .222 with three home runs & sixteen RBIs.

Houston Astros
Toward the end of Spring training , the Dodgers signed free agent veteran catcher Rick Dempsey. Five days later, the Dodgers released Treviño. Soon afterwards, Treviño signed with the Houston Astros. He spent the 1988 season platooning with Alan Ashby behind the plate, and the  season as Craig Biggio's back up.

After two full seasons in Houston, Treviño spent his final year in Major League baseball with three different teams. Treviño began the  season in Houston, then returned to the New York Mets briefly before finishing his career back in Cincinnati with the Reds.

Career statistics

Treviño went three for ten in his return to the Mets in 1990. He holds the franchise record for most at bats without a home run (733). He's hit two against them in 131 at bats.

Broadcasting career
Alex joined the Houston Astros broadcast team in 1996 and has called more than 3,000 Astros games, seven postseason appearances and the 2005 World Series run. In September 2014, Alex was inducted into the Houston Baseball Media Wall of Honor for his significant and lasting contributions to the landscape of Houston baseball through his work in broadcasting. As of 2019, Alex's 24 seasons in the broadcast booth are the most in franchise history by a Spanish broadcaster, surpassing Orlando Sanchez Diago's record of 21 years.

References

External links
, or The Ultimate Mets Database
Alex Treviño at SABR

1957 births
Atlanta Braves players
Baseball players from Nuevo León
Cincinnati Reds players
Houston Astros announcers
Houston Astros players
Living people
Lynchburg Mets players
Los Angeles Dodgers players
Louisville Redbirds players
Major League Baseball broadcasters
Major League Baseball catchers
Major League Baseball players from Mexico
Marion Mets players
Mexican expatriate baseball players in the United States
Mexican League baseball managers
Midland Angels players
New York Mets players
San Francisco Giants players
Sportspeople from Monterrey
Sultanes de Monterrey players
Tidewater Tides players
Tucson Toros players
Wausau Mets players